Slavko Nowytski (October 19, 1934 - November 28, 2019) was a Ukrainian American filmmaker.

Films
1983 Harvest of Despair
2003 Between Hitler and Stalin
1976 Pysanka: The Ukrainian Easter Egg
1971 Sheep in Wood
1979 Immortal Image

References

External links
Slavko Nowytski

1934 births
2019 deaths
Ukrainian film directors
American film directors
Ukrainian SSR emigrants to the United States
People from Volyn Oblast